The 30th Armoured Brigade was an armoured formation of the British Army that served in Western Europe Campaign as part of the 79th Armoured Division.  After the reformation of the Territorial Army in 1947, the brigade was re-created within the Territorials based in Scotland and finally disbanded by 1967.

Second World War

Service 

The 30th Armoured Brigade was created on 27 December 1940 as part of Northern Command. It was initially formed from the 2nd Battalion, The Queen's Westminsters, a motorized infantry unit, which was joined by a cavalry unit, the 23rd Hussars, three days later, on 30 December. Just over a week later, on 8 January 1941, the 23rd Hussars were replaced by the 22nd Dragoons, and on 28 January the brigade was transferred to Western Command.

On 8 March the brigade was augmented with the addition of another cavalry unit, the 2nd County of London Yeomanry (Westminster Dragoons), and the following day another armoured regiment, the 1st Lothians and Border Yeomanry was added, and the brigade also became part of the 11th Armoured Division, alongside the 29th Brigade, for training, under the command of Major-General Percy Hobart, and operating the Valentine tank. Soon after, on 22 March, the 2nd Queen's Westminsters were renamed the 12th Battalion, King's Royal Rifle Corps.

On 20 April 1942 the brigade was briefly transferred to the 3rd Armoured Group, and on 13 May it was transferred again to the 42nd Armoured Division. The brigade lost the 12th KRRC on 15 October 1943, and two days later, on 17 October was transferred for the last time, joining the 79th Armoured Division, and finding itself once again under the overall command of Percy Hobart.

It now consisted of three Armoured units - the 22nd Dragoons, 1st Lothian and Border Yeomanry, and the Westminster Dragoons - that would remain the backbone of the brigade. After a succession of officers, command was assumed by Brigadier Nigel W. Duncan on 6 December 1943. Duncan would command the brigade during its active service from D-Day until after the end of the war in Europe.

By the time of the Normandy landings on 6 June 1944 all three units of the 30th Armoured Brigade were operating the Sherman Crab flail tank, designed to clear paths through minefields and other obstructions. However in common with other 79th Division units they rarely found themselves operating together. On D-Day itself, 'A' Squadron of the 22nd Dragoons, and two troops of 'C' Squadron, landed on Sword Beach with the first wave, while the 22nd's 'B' Squadron landed on Juno Beach, with the remainder of 'C' Squadron, landing there later in the day. The Westminster Dragoons 'B' and 'C' Squadrons landed alongside the 50th Infantry Division on 'Jig' and 'King' sectors of Gold Beach in the first wave, with 'A' Squadron landing later in the day on 'Queen' sector of Sword Beach. The 1st Lothian and Border Yeomanry did not arrive in France until 12 July, but soon found itself in action around Caen.

30th Brigade continued in action for the rest of the war, taking part in several operations, including the assault on Le Havre in September 1944, the invasion of Walcheren ("Operation Infatuate II") in November 1944, and the crossing of the Rhine in March 1945.

It also had various additional units attached to it temporarily. The 141st Regiment Royal Armoured Corps was part of the brigade from July to September 1944, and the 11th Royal Tank Regiment was added from December 1944 to January 1945. 11th RTR returned with 4th Royal Tank Regiment at the end of March 1945 until the end of April.

Finally, the 22nd Dragoons, the 1st Lothians and Border Yeomanry and the Westminster Dragoons were all transferred from the brigade on 31 August 1945, bringing its existence to an end.

Order of battle

Commanders

Post-war in Territorial Army
After a short time of disbandment, the brigade was reformed in Scotland as a fully Territorial Army formation, known as the 30th (Lowland) Independent Armoured Brigade.  The new formation fell under control of Scottish Command and was headquartered in Glasgow.  The brigade's structure in 1947 was as follows:

 Brigade Headquarters, in Lanark?
 30th (Lowland) Independent Armoured Brigade Signal Squadron, Royal Corps of Signals
 Ayrshire (Earl of Carrick's Own) Yeomanry, in Ayr
 Queen's Own Royal Glasgow Yeomanry, in Glasgow
 Lanarkshire Yeomanry, in Lanark
 Lothians & Border Horse Yeomanry, in Edinburgh
 30th (Lowland) Independent Armoured Brigade Royal Army Service Corps
 30th (Lowland) Independent Armoured Brigade Royal Army Ordnance Corps
 30th (Lowland) Independent Armoured Brigade Field Dressing Station, Royal Army Medical Corps
 30th (Lowland) Independent Armoured Brigade Provost Unit, Royal Military Police

The brigade's history following its recreation is unknown, however its signal squadron was absorbed into 52nd (Lowland) Signal Regiment in 1950.

According to an Army Order regarding the reorganisation of armoured brigades in 1951, the 30th Armoured Brigade (TA) was to be converted to a flamethrower tank role. 

In 1956, the signal squadron tasked with supporting the brigade was disbanded.  The three lowland armoured regiments were then amalgamated: Lanarkshire Yeomanry, Queen's Own Royal Glasgow Yeomanry, and Lothians & Border Horse Yeomanry became the Queen's Own Lowland Yeomanry. It is therefore possible that the brigade was disbanded in 1956.

According to Colin Mackie's 'Senior Army Appointments: 1860–present', the brigade was redesignated as the 156th (Lowland) Infantry Brigade in the also reformed 52nd (Lowland) Infantry Division in 1956.

See also

 British Armoured formations of World War II
 List of British brigades of the Second World War

Footnotes

References

External links 
 

Armoured brigades of the British Army in World War II
Military units and formations established in 1940
Military units and formations disestablished in 1945
1940 establishments in the United Kingdom
1945 disestablishments in the United Kingdom